Within the cinema of India, the following is a List of Kannada films of 2005.

List of released films in 2005

January–June

July – December

References

External links
 Kannada Movies of 2005 at the Internet Movie Database

2005
Lists of 2005 films by country or language
2005 in Indian cinema